Epidius parvati, is a species of spider of the genus Epidius. It is endemic to Sri Lanka. The specific name parvati came from the name of Hindu goddess Parvati.

See also
 List of Thomisidae species

References

Thomisidae
Endemic fauna of Sri Lanka
Spiders of Asia
Spiders described in 2000